Insenborn is a village in the commune of Neunhausen, in north-western Luxembourg.  , the village had a population of 157.

Geography 
Insenborn lies on the South bank of the Lac Sûre, which is an artificial lake on the river Sûre (Sauer).

Worth a look 

Insenborn Church

Villages in Luxembourg
Wiltz (canton)